Omnipresent is a 2017 Bulgarian drama film directed by Ilian Djevelekov. It was selected as the Bulgarian entry for the Best Foreign Language Film at the 91st Academy Awards, but it was not nominated.

Cast
 Velislav Pavlov as Emil
 Teodora Duhovnikova as Anna
 Vesela Babinova as Maria
 Anastassia Liutova as Nia

Awards
 Golden Rose Bulgarian Feature Film Festival (2017) for Best Film and  Best Actor
 Critics Guild Award

See also
 List of submissions to the 91st Academy Awards for Best Foreign Language Film
 List of Bulgarian submissions for the Academy Award for Best Foreign Language Film

References

External links
 

2017 films
2017 drama films
Bulgarian drama films
2010s Bulgarian-language films